FDTI may refer to:

 Functional Diffusion Tractography Imaging
 The California Learning Resources Network's Free Digital Textbook Initiative; cf. open educational resources
 Fault Detection Time Interval

See also

 FTDI